The 2005–06 Magyar Kupa (English: Hungarian Cup) was the 66th season of Hungary's annual knock-out cup football competition.

Quarter-finals
The first legs were played on March 15 and 22, 2006, while the second legs were played on March 22, 29 and April 5.

|}

Semi-finals
The first legs were played on April 25 and 26, 2006, while the second legs were played on May 2 and 3.

|}

Final

See also
 2005–06 Nemzeti Bajnokság I
 2005–06 Nemzeti Bajnokság II

References

External links
 Official site 
 soccerway.com

2005–06 in Hungarian football
2005–06 domestic association football cups
2005-06